Seefood TV is a Norwegian production company for television and film. Seefood produce for the Norwegian broadcasters TV2, TVNorge og NRK. The company was founded in 2001 by Kristian Ødegård og Espen Eckbo and their first production was the reality parody Santas In A Barn. Aleksander Herresthal joined the company as a partner and CEO in 2007 and is working today as Chief Creative Officer. The company has produced several award-winning and critically acclaimed comedy series for television. Their productions have been nominated for a total of 46 Gullruten awards (Norwegian Emmy) and have won 8 Norwegian Comedy Awards.

Productions
 Superhero Academy, comedy drama NRK 2020-
 Granddad, comedy drama TV2 2020-
 Celebrity Task Force, reality show / entertainment TV2 2020-
 Jul i Blodfjell 2, comedy crime drama Discovery Networks (Norway) 2019
 It could have been worse, comedy drama Discovery Networks (Norway) 2018-
 Couples Therapy, comedy drama NRK 2017-
 Jul i Blodfjell, comedy crime drama Discovery Networks (Norway) 2017
 Kongsvikfamiliene, comedy drama Discovery Networks (Norway) 2018
 Hit for hit, comedy drama NRK 2017
 Kongsvik-klinikken, comedy drama Discovery Networks (Norway) 2017
 Narvestad på ferie, comedy drama NRK 2016
 Best før, comedy drama TV2 2015-
 Mellom bakkar og berg, comedy drama TVNorge 2015
 The Know Show, entertainment, quiz TV2 2015-
 Kollektivet, comedy show TV2 2010-2016
 Klovn til kaffen, entertainment TV2 2015-2017
 Costa del Kongsvik, comedy drama TVN 2012-2014
 På tur med Dag Otto, entertainment TV2 2013-2017
 Asbjørn Brekke show, comedy talkshow TVN  2012-2016
 Kongsvik videregående, comedy drama TVN 2012
 Nissene over skog og hei, comedy drama TVN 2011
 Kongsvik Ungedomsskole, comedy drama TVN 2011
 På hjul med Dag Otto, entertainment TV2 2010
 Tett på Tre, comedy drama TV 2 2008
 Santas In A Barn, comedy series TVNorge 2001
 På klozz hold, comedy series TVNorge 2002
 Tonight with Timothy Dahle, comedy talkshow TV2 2003
 TV2-nøttene, comedy quiz TV2 2004-2008
 Jul i Tøyengata, comedy drama TVNorge 2006
 Best of Espen Eckbo, comedy show TV2 2007
 Lille Nøtteaften, comedy show TV2 2006, 2007 og 2008
 Det var en gang et eventyr, drama series NRK 2008
 Three Through One, comedy drama TV2 2008
 På hjul med Dag Otto, entertainment TV2 2010
 Kolonihagen, entertainment TV2 2010
 Påpp & Råkk, comedy drama NRK 2010

Television in Norway